Hubertus Strughold (June 15, 1898 – September 25, 1986) was a German-born physiologist, war criminal, and prominent medical researcher. Beginning in 1935 he served as chief of aeromedical research for Hermann Göring's Ministry of Aviation, holding this position throughout World War II. In 1947 he was brought to the United States as part of Operation Paperclip and went on to serve in a number of high-level scientific posts with the US Air Force and NASA.

For his role in pioneering the study of the physical and psychological effects of manned spaceflight he became known as "The Father of Space Medicine". Following his death, Strughold's activities in Germany during World War II came under greater scrutiny in the media and allegations surrounding his involvement in Nazi-era human experimentation greatly damaged his legacy.

Biography

Early life and academic career
Strughold was born in the town of Westtünnen-im-Hamm, in the Prussian province of Westphalia, on 15 June 1898. After completeing Gymnasium in 1918, Strughold studied medicine and the natural sciences at the Ludwig Maximilian University of Munich and the Georg August University of Göttingen, earning his doctorate (Dr. phil.) in 1922. He went on to obtain his medical degree (Dr. med.) from the University of Münster the following year and completed his habilitation (Dr. med. habil.) at the Julius Maximilian University of Würzburg in 1927. Strughold continued working at the University of Würzburg where he served as a research assistant to the renowned physiologist Dr. Maximilian von Frey while pursuing a career as a professor of physiology.

During this time Strughold's attention was increasingly drawn to the emerging science of aviation medicine and he collaborated with the famed World War I pilot Robert Ritter von Greim to study the effects of high-altitude flight on human biology. In 1928 Strughold traveled to the United States on a year-long research fellowship from the Rockefeller Foundation. He would tour the medical laboratories at Harvard, Columbia and the Mayo Clinic and also conducted specialized research on aviation medicine and human physiology at Western Reserve University and the University of Chicago. Strughold returned to Germany the following year and accepted a teaching position at the Würzburg Physiological Institute, eventually becoming a full professor in 1931.

Work for Nazi Germany
Through his association with Robert Ritter von Greim (now Adolf Hitler's personal pilot), Strughold became acquainted socially with Hermann Göring and other high-ranking members of the Nazi regime, though he never formally joined the Nazi Party. In April 1935, he was appointed director of the Berlin-based Research Institute for Aviation Medicine, a medical think tank that operated under the auspices of the Reich Ministry of Aviation. Under Strughold's leadership, the Institute grew to become Germany's foremost aeromedical research establishment, pioneering the study of the physical effects of high-altitude and supersonic speed flight, along with establishing the altitude chamber concept of "time of useful consciousness". Beginning in 1936 Strughold also served as co-editor of the medical journal Luftfahrtmedizin (Aviation Medicine).

Though he was ostensibly a civilian researcher, the majority of the studies and projects Strughold's institute undertook during this time were commissioned and financed by the German armed forces (principally the Luftwaffe) as part of the Nazi's ongoing policy of re-armament preceding World War II. With the outbreak of war in 1939, the organization was absorbed into the German military and attached to the medical corps of the Luftwaffe where it was renamed the Air Force Institute for Aviation Medicine and placed under the command of Surgeon-General (Generaloberstabsarzt) Erich Hippke. Strughold was also commissioned as an officer in the German air force, eventually rising to the rank of Colonel (Oberst), and was elected as a member of the German National Academy of Sciences Leopoldina in 1941.

Human experimentation
In October 1942, Strughold and Hippke attended a medical conference in Nuremberg where  SS-Hauptsturmführer Dr. Sigmund Rascher delivered a presentation outlining various "scientific" experiments he had conducted in conjunction with members of the Luftwaffe medical corps in which prisoners from the Dachau concentration camp were used as human test subjects. These experiments included physiological tests during which camp inmates were immersed in freezing water, placed in air pressure chambers, forced to consume seawater and made to endure exploratory surgery without anesthetic. Many of the inmates forced to participate died as a result. What, if any, role Strughold himself may have had in planning or authorizing Rascher's experiments remains a source of controversy. However several junior Luftwaffe physicians who had participated in the medical atrocities at Dachau had close personal and professional ties to Strughold, through both the Institute for Aviation Medicine and the Luftwaffe medical corps.

Following the German surrender in May 1945, Strughold was placed under house arrest by British occupation forces in Göttingen. He later claimed to Allied authorities that, despite his senior position with the Luftwaffe medical corps and his attendance at the October 1942 Nuremberg conference, he had no knowledge of the atrocities committed at Dachau. He was never subsequently charged with any wrongdoing by the Allies. However, a 1946 memorandum produced by the staff of the Nuremberg Trials listed Strughold as one of thirteen "persons, firms or individuals implicated" in the war crimes committed at Dachau. In addition, several of Strughold's wartime associates, including his former assistant Hermann Becker-Freyseng, were convicted of crimes against humanity in connection with the Dachau experiments at the 1946-1947 Nuremberg Doctor's Trial. During these proceedings, Strughold contributed several affidavits for the defense on behalf of his accused colleagues.

Work for the United States
In October 1945 Strughold returned to academia, becoming director of the Physiological Institute at Heidelberg University.  He also began working on behalf of the US Army Air Force, becoming Chief Scientist of its Aeromedical Center, which was located on the campus of the former Kaiser Wilhelm Institute for Medical Research. In this capacity Strughold edited German Aviation Medicine in World War II, a book-length summary of the knowledge gained by German aviation researchers during the war.

In 1947, Strughold was brought to the United States, along with many other highly valuable German scientists, as part of Operation Paperclip. With another former Luftwaffe physician, Richard Lindenberg, Strughold was assigned to the US Air Force base at Randolph Field near San Antonio, Texas. It was while at Randolph Field that Strughold began conducting some of the first research into the potential medical challenges posed by space travel, in conjunction with fellow "Paperclip Scientist" Dr. Heinz Haber. Strughold coined the terms "space medicine" and "astrobiology" to describe this area of study in 1948. The following year he was appointed as the first and only Professor of Space Medicine at the US Air Force's newly established School of Aviation Medicine (SAM), one of the first institutions dedicated to conducting research on "astrobiology" and the so-called "human factors" associated with manned spaceflight. He also first described "Mars jars", containers that simulate the atmosphere of Mars, that have now become an essential tool in astrobiological research.

Under Strughold, the School of Aviation Medicine conducted pioneering studies on issues such as atmospheric control, the physical effects of weightlessness and the disruption of normal time cycles. In 1951 Strughold revolutionized existing notions concerning spaceflight when he co-authored the influential research paper Where Does Space Begin? in which he proposed that space was present in small gradations that grew as altitude levels increased, rather than existing in remote regions of the atmosphere. Between 1952 and 1954 he would oversee the building of the space cabin simulator, a sealed chamber in which human test subjects were placed for extended periods of time in order to view the potential physical, astrobiological, and psychological effects of extra-atmospheric flight.

Strughold obtained US citizenship in 1956 and was appointed Chief Scientist of the National Aeronautics and Space Administration's (NASA) Aerospace Medical Division in 1962. While at NASA, Strughold played a central role in designing the pressure suit and onboard life support systems used by both the Gemini and Apollo astronauts. He also directed the specialized training of the flight surgeons and medical staff of the Apollo program in advance of the planned mission to the Moon. Strughold retired from his position at NASA in 1968.

Controversy 
During his work on behalf of the US Air Force and NASA, Strughold was the subject of three separate US government investigations into his suspected involvement in war crimes committed under the Nazis. A 1958 investigation by the Justice Department fully exonerated Strughold, while a second inquiry launched by the Immigration and Naturalization Service in 1974 was later abandoned due to lack of evidence. In 1983 the Office of Special Investigations reopened his case but withdrew from the effort when Strughold died in September 1986.

After his death, Strughold's alleged connection to the Dachau experiments became more widely known following the release of US Army Intelligence documents from 1945 that listed him among those being sought as war criminals by US authorities. These revelations did significant damage to Strughold's reputation and resulted in the revocation of various honors that had been bestowed upon him over the course of his career. In 1993, at the request of the World Jewish Congress, his portrait was removed from a mural of prominent physicians displayed at Ohio State University. 

Following similar protests by the Anti-Defamation League (ADL), the Air Force decided in 1995 to rename the Hubertus Strughold Aeromedical Library at Brooks Air Force Base, which had been named in Strughold's honor in 1977. His portrait, however, still hangs there. Further action by the ADL also led to Strughold's removal from the International Space Hall of Fame in Alamogordo, New Mexico in May 2006.

Later revelations
Further questions about Strughold's activities during World War II emerged in 2004 following an investigation conducted by the Historical Committee of the German Society of Air and Space Medicine. The inquiry uncovered evidence of oxygen deprivation experiments carried out by Strughold's Institute for Aviation Medicine in 1943. According to these findings six epileptic children, between the ages of 11 and 13, were taken from the Nazis' Brandenburg Euthanasia Centre to Strughold's Berlin laboratory where they were placed in vacuum chambers to induce epileptic seizures in an effort to simulate the effects of high-altitude sicknesses, such as hypoxia. 

While, unlike the Dachau experiments, all the test subjects survived the research process, this revelation led the Society of Air and Space Medicine to abolish a major award bearing Strughold's name. A similar campaign by American scholars prompted the US branch of the Aerospace Medical Association to announce in 2013 that it would retire a similar award, also named in Strughold's honor, which it had been bestowing since 1963. The move was met with opposition from defenders of Strughold, citing his many notable contributions to the American space program and the lack of any formal proof of his direct involvement in war crimes.

Awards and honors
Known as The Father of Space Medicine
Theodore C. Lyster Award, Aerospace Medical Association, 1958
Louis H. Bauer Founders Award, Aerospace Medical Association, 1965

Hubertus Strughold Award
The Hubertus Strughold Award was established by the Space Medicine Branch, known today as the Space Medicine Association, a member organization of the Aerospace Medical Association. In 1962 the Award was established in honor of Dr. Hubertus Strughold, also known as "The Father of Space Medicine". The award was presented every year from 1963 through 2012 to a Space Medicine Branch member for outstanding contributions in applications and research in the field of space-related medical research.

Awardees

1960s
1963 Cpt. Ashton Graybiel, Cpt. M.D., USN
1964 Maj. Gen. Otis O. Benson, Jr., USAF, M.C.
1965 Hans-Georg Clamann, M.D.
1966 Hermann J. Schaefer, Ph.D.
1967 Charles Alden Berry, M.D.
1968 David G. Simons, M.D.
1969 Col. Stanley C. White, M.D., USAF, M.C.

1970s
1970 RearAdm Frank Burkhart Voris, MC, USN
1971 Dr. Donald Davis Flickinger, M.D.
1972 Col. Paul A. Campbell, USAF (Ret.)
1973 Andres Ingver Karstens, M.D.
1974 Cdr. Joseph P. Kerwin, MC, USN
1975 Lawrence F. Dietlein, M.D.
1976 Harald J. von Beckh
1977 William Kennedy Douglas
1978 Walton L. Jones, Jr., M.D.
1979 Col. John E. Pickering, USAF (Ret.)

1980s
1980 Rufus R. Hessberg, M.D.
1981 Maj. Gen. Heinz S. Fuchs, GAF, MC (Ret.)
1982 Sidney D. Leverett, Jr., Ph.D.
1983 Sherman Vonograd P., M.D.
1984 Arnauld E. Nicogossian, M.D.
1985 Philip C. Johnson, Jr., M.D.
1986 Carolyn Leach Huntoon, Ph.D.
1987 Karl E. Klein, M.D.
1988 Anatoly Ivanovich Grigoriev, M.D.
1989 Brig. Gen. Eduard C. Burchard, GAF, MC

1990s
1990 Joan Vernikos-Danellis, M.D.
1991 Stanley R. Mohler, M.D.
1992 Roberta Lynn Bondar, M.D.
1993 George Wyckliffe Hoffler, M.D.
1994 Emmett B. Ferguson, M.D.
1995 Mary Anne Bassett Frey, Ph.D.
1996 Norman E. Thagard, M.D.
1997 Shannon Matilda Wells Lucid, Ph.D.
1998 Valeri V. Polyakov, M.D.
1999 Sam Lee Pool, M.D.

2000s
2000 Franklin Story Musgrave, M.D.
2001 John B. Charles, Ph.D.
2002 Earl Howard Wood, M.D., Ph.D.
2003 Jonathan Clark (for STS 107 crew)
2004 No award
2005 William S. Augerson, M.D.
2006 Jeffrey R. Davis, M.D.
2007 Clarence A. Jernigan, M.D.
2008 Richard Jennings, M.D.
2009 Jim Vanderploeg, M.D.

2010s
2010 Irene Duhart Long, M.D.
2011 Michael Barratt, M.D.
2012 Smith L. Johnston III, M.D.
2013 Award retired by the Space Medicine Association

See also
Aerospace Medical Association
Human factors and ergonomics
Nazi human experimentation
Sigmund Rascher

References

Bibliography

External links
 February 22, 1982, March 8, 1982, March 15, 1982, April 19, 1982, April 27, 1982, Interview with Hubertus Strughold, May 23, 1982, University of Texas at San Antonio: Institute of Texan Cultures: Oral History Collection, UA 15.01, University of Texas at San Antonio Libraries Special Collections.

1898 births
1986 deaths
People from Hamm
Physicians in the Nazi Party
People from the Province of Westphalia
Luftwaffe personnel of World War II
German military doctors
German physiologists
Rockefeller Fellows
Ludwig Maximilian University of Munich alumni
University of Göttingen alumni
University of Würzburg alumni
Academic staff of Heidelberg University
German emigrants to the United States
United States Air Force civilians
People from San Antonio
Early spaceflight scientists
NASA people
American physiologists
Operation Paperclip
United States Air Force School of Aerospace Medicine
Recipients of the Order of Merit of the Federal Republic of Germany